Juventus Football Club finished second in Serie A following the 1995-96 season and regained the European Cup trophy after 11 years, winning the Champions League final against Ajax 4–2 on penalties in Rome. Juventus also won the Supercoppa Italiana in the late summer of 1995, before going on to finish second in the league. Following the Champions League title, strikers Gianluca Vialli and Fabrizio Ravanelli were sold to Chelsea and Middlesbrough, respectively. The club also dropped Pietro Vierchowod, Paulo Sousa and Massimo Carrera. Instead, Juventus decided to sign playmaker Zinedine Zidane from Bordeaux, along with young striker Christian Vieri, who signed from Atalanta.

Players

Squad information
Squad at end of season

Left club during season

Competitions

Supercoppa Italiana

Serie A

League table

Results by round

Transfers

Matches

Coppa Italia

Second round

Third Round

UEFA Champions League

Group stage

Knockout phase

Quarter-finals

Semi-finals

Final

Statistics

Players statistics

Goalscorers

References

Juventus F.C. seasons
Juventus
UEFA Champions League-winning seasons